Pine Hill is a mountain in Schoharie County, New York. It is located northeast of Seward. Barrack Zourie is located east-southeast of Pine Hill.

References

Mountains of Schoharie County, New York
Mountains of New York (state)